Shenzhen, a major city and Special Economic Zone in Guangdong, China, is home to over 349 completed skyscrapers of which at least 120 are taller than , making it the 2nd largest concentration in the world after neighbouring Hong Kong. The tallest building in Shenzhen is the Ping An Finance Centre, which rises . The 115-story skyscraper also stands as the second-tallest building in China and the fifth-tallest building in the world. At , the KK100 is the second-tallest completed building in the city.

Skyscraper construction started in Shenzhen in 1978, at a time when the tallest building in the city was five stories tall. In the next decade, 300 high-rises were erected in the city, including the Guomao Building. It was the city's first skyscraper and was the tallest building in mainland China upon its opening in 1985. As Shenzhen's highrise construction boom progressed into the 1990s, the skyscrapers erected in the city became taller. The tallest of these is the Diwang Building (Shun Hing Square), the city's first building to exceed  in height. Most of Shenzhen's skyscrapers are concentrated in the Luohu, Futian and Nanshan districts. Shenzhen's skyscraper boom is attributed to its status as one of the fastest-growing cities in the world.

Tallest buildings
This includes spires and architectural details but does not include antenna masts. Buildings that have already topped out are also included.

Tallest buildings by district
This lists the tallest building in each district of Shenzhen stand at least 200 metres based on standard height measurement.

Tallest buildings by function
This lists the tallest buildings in Shenzhen by their respective functions—office, hotel, residential and mixed-use—based on standard height measurement.

Timeline of tallest buildings
This is a list of buildings that in the past held, or currently holds the title of tallest building in Shenzhen.

Under construction
This lists buildings that are under construction in Shenzhen with at least 150m (492 feet) in height.

See also
 List of tallest buildings in China

References
General

Specific

External links
Diagram of Shenzhen skyscrapers on SkyscraperPage

Shenzhen
Shenzhen-related lists